Wellman-Union Consolidated Independent School District is a public school district based in Wellman, Texas (USA).

Located in Terry County, the district extends into a small portion of Gaines County.

The district was created on July 1, 1997 by the consolidation of the Wellman and Union districts.

Academic achievement
In 2009, the school district was rated "recognized" by the Texas Education Agency.

Schools
Wellman-Union Secondary School (grades 6-12)
Wellman-Union Elementary School (grades K-5)

Special programs

Athletics
Wellman-Union High School plays six-man football.

See also

List of school districts in Texas

References

External links
 Wellman-Union CISD

School districts in Terry County, Texas
School districts in Gaines County, Texas
1997 establishments in Texas
School districts established in 1997